The 2021–22 Colorado Avalanche season was the 43rd season for the National Hockey League (NHL) franchise that joined the league in 1979, 26th playing season since the franchise relocated from Quebec prior to the start of the 1995–96 NHL season, and 50th season overall, including their play in the World Hockey Association (WHA), where the franchise was established in 1972.

On April 5, 2022, the Avalanche clinched a playoff berth after a 6–4 win against the Pittsburgh Penguins. On April 16, the Avalanche clinched the Central Division along with the top seed in the Western Conference after a 7–4 win against the Carolina Hurricanes. They went on to earn 119 points, breaking the franchise record set in 2000-01.

On June 6, the Avalanche swept the Edmonton Oilers to advance to their first Stanley Cup Finals since 2001. On June 26, 2022, the Avalanche won their third Stanley Cup and first since 2001 after they defeated the two-time defending champion Tampa Bay Lightning in the Stanley Cup Finals, in six games.

Standings

Divisional standings

Conference standings

Schedule and results

Preseason

Regular season

Playoffs

Player statistics
Final stats
Skaters

Goaltenders

†Denotes player spent time with another team before joining the Avalanche. Stats reflect time with the Avalanche only.
‡Denotes player was traded mid-season. Stats reflect time with the Avalanche only.
Bold/italics denotes franchise record.

Suspensions/fines

Transactions
The Avalanche have been involved in the following transactions during the 2021–22 season.

Trades

Notes:
 Arizona will receive a third-round pick in 2024 if Colorado wins the 2022 Stanley Cup and Kuemper in 50% of their playoff games; otherwise no pick will be exchanged.

Players acquired

Players lost

Signings

Draft picks

Below are the Colorado Avalanche's selections at the 2021 NHL Entry Draft, which was held on July 23 and 24, 2021, virtually via video conference call from the NHL Network studios in Secaucus, New Jersey, due to the COVID-19 pandemic.

References

Colorado Avalanche
Colorado Avalanche seasons
Colorado Avalanche
Colorado Avalanche
Western Conference (NHL) championship seasons
Colorado
Stanley Cup championship seasons